The Life Collection is a 24-disc DVD box set of eight titles from David Attenborough's 'Life' series of BBC natural history programmes. It was released in the UK on 5 December 2005 and has also been made available on Region 4 DVD in Australia and New Zealand. The Region 4 DVD contains four fewer discs as Life on Earth is not included. It has not yet been issued in Region 1 encoding for the US.

Contents
Life on Earth (1979)
The Living Planet (1984)
The Trials of Life (1990)
Life in the Freezer (1993)
The Private Life of Plants (1995)
The Life of Birds (1998)
The Life of Mammals (2002)
Life in the Undergrowth (2005)

The ninth part of the "Life" series, Life in Cold Blood (2008), was not yet available at the time of the release of this set and is not included.

Life Collection, The